This is a list of characters who cross-dress, whether LGBTQ+ or not, in animated series. This includes some characters listed on the list of animated series with LGBTQ characters page, drag queens, drag kings, tomboys, janegirls and others who cross-dress.

Cross-dressing generally runs counter to established gender norms and can be seen as a form of transgender behavior but it doesn't always indicate such an identity, even though popular media often "lump cross-dressing and homosexuality together." There is also the phenomenon of "situational cross-dressing" where heterosexual characters cross-dress as a plot device or "other non-gender-expressive reasons," especially superheroes and supervillains. Harry Benshoff and Sean Griffin write that animation has always "hint[ed] at the performative nature of gender" such as when Bugs Bunny puts on a wig and a dress, he is a rabbit in drag as a human male who is in drag as a female. This was proceeded by cross-dressing in motion pictures began in the early days of the silent films. For instance, Charlie Chaplin and Stan Laurel occasionally dressed as women in their films. Even the beefy American actor Wallace Beery appeared in a series of silent films as a Swedish woman. The Three Stooges, especially Curly (Jerry Howard), sometimes appeared in drag in their short films. The tradition has continued for many years, usually played for laughs. Only in recent decades have there been dramatic films in which cross-dressing was included, possibly because of strict censorship of American films until the mid-1960s.

The names are organized alphabetically by surname (i.e. last name), or by single name if the character does not have a surname. If more than two characters are in one entry, the last name of the first character is used.

List of characters

See also

 History of cross-dressing
 Cross-dressing in literature
 Cross-dressing in film and television
 List of yaoi anime and manga
 List of yuri works
 List of LGBT-related films by year
 List of animated films with LGBT characters
 List of tomboys in fiction

Notes

References

Citations

Sources

 

 
 
Crossdressing
Lists of animated series
crossdressing
animated
crossdressing